The Sanremo Music Festival 2007 was the 57th Sanremo Music Festival, held at the Teatro Ariston in Sanremo. The show was held during the five nights between 27 February 2007 and 3 March 2007.

The contest, broadcast by Rai 1, was presented by Pippo Baudo and Michelle Hunziker. The competition included two different sections. The "Big Artists" section, starring twenty established singers, was won by Simone Cristicchi with the song "Ti regalerò una rosa", while the newcomers' section, featuring 14 debuting or little known artists, was won by Fabrizio Moro's "Pensa".

Nights

First night

Big Artists and Newcomers section
Key:
 – Contestant competing in the "Big Artists" section.
 – Contestant competing in the "Newcomer Artists" section.

Guests and other performances
 At the beginning of the show, co-presenter Michelle Hunziker covered "Adesso tu". The song, originally performed by her ex-husband Eros Ramazzotti, won the contest in 1986.
 Italian comedian Antonio Cornacchione performed a piece of political satire.
 Hunziker performed a song from her musical theatre stage work Tutti insieme appassionatamente, an Italian adaptation of the film The Sound of Music.
 American pop group Scissor Sisters performed the hit "I Don't Feel Like Dancin'".
 American singer-songwriter Norah Jones sang and played piano on her single "Thinking About You".

Second night

Big Artists and Newcomers section
Key:
 – Contestant competing in the "Big Artists" section.
 – Contestant competing in the "Newcomer Artists" section.

Guests and other performances
 At the beginning of the night, Hunziker and Baudo performed the song "Non ho l'età", which won the competition 1964 being performed by Gigliola Cinquetti.
 Italian comedy duo Ficarra e Picone performed a piece in memory of Pino Puglisi, a priest who was killed by Sicilian Mafia after challenging the criminal syndicate itself.
 British boyband Take That was the first international guest of the night, performing their song "Shine". The band had previously performed as a guest during the Sanremo Music Festival in 1996, a few days before splitting.
 American R&B singer-songwriter John Legend sang his single "Save Room", which was performed for the first time during a TV program. Legend also performed his hit "Ordinary People".

Third night

Big Artists section

Guests and other performances
 Spanish singer and actor Miguel Ángel Muñoz sang his single "Dirás que estoy loco", with a choreography performed by six dancers.
 Italian comedian Max Tortora impersonated Franco Califano, performing a satirical piece.

Fourth night

The running order of the contestants was decided by a drawing at the beginning of the night.

Newcomers section

Guests and other performances
 Spanish actress Penélope Cruz was interviewed by Pippo Baudo during the night.
 Franco Battiato performed his songs "La cura", "I giorni della monotonia" and "Il vuoto", together with Mab, a hard rock band produced by Battiato himself.
 Gigi D'Alessio performed a cover of Lucio Battisti's "Il nastro rosa". He also played piano while Lara Fabian sang Tomaso Albinoni's "Adagio". Finally, D'Alessio and Fabian duetted, performing Battisti's "Un cuore malato".
 Elisa performed her singles "Luce (Tramonti a nord est)", which won the contest in 2001, and "Eppure sentire", as well as a cover of Mia Martini's "Almeno tu nell'universo".
 Renato Zero tributed Italian singer-songwriters Luigi Tenco, Bruno Lauzi and Sergio Endrigo, performing a medley of "Ciao amore", "Ritornerai" and "Era d'estate". He also sang a medley of his hits "Il carrozzone", "Ave Maria" and "Il cielo".
 Gianna Nannini performed the songs "Dolente Pia" and "Mura Mura" from her musical Pia come la canto io, inspired by Pia de' Tolomei, a historical character also appearing in Dante Alighieri's Divine Comedy.
 Tiziano Ferro performed his songs "Ed ero contentissimo", "Ti scatterò una foto", "Sere nere" and "Non me lo so spiegare".
 Italian actor Neri Marcorè impersonated Luciano Ligabue, performing "L'IVA", a satirical cover of his song "Viva".
 Armando Trovajoli also appeared, receiving an award given by the Italian Society of Authors and Publishers.

Fifth night

Big Artists section

Guests and other performances
 Italian television presenter Mike Bongiorno opened the show with Michelle Hunziker. Bongiorno presented the Sanremo Music Festival 11 times during the previous years. Since Baudo presented the show for the twelfth time in 2007, overtaking Bongiorno's record, Bongiorno was invited to tie Baudo's number of appearances during the contest.
 British singer Joss Stone performed her single "Tell Me 'bout It" and tributed Aretha Franklin covering "Respect".
 Mika also appeared during the final night, singing his hit "Grace Kelly".
 Italian TV presenter and actor was another guest of the show, performing some short comedy scenes with Pippo Baudo.

Other awards

Critics Award "Mia Martini"

Big Artists section

Newcomers section

Press, Radio & TV Award

Big Artists section

Newcomers section

Ratings

References

Sanremo Music Festival by year
2007 in Italian music
2007 song contests
2007 in Italian television